Hamlin is a city in Brown County, Kansas, United States.  As of the 2020 census, the population of the city was 25.

History
Hamlin was laid out in 1870. It was named in honor of Hannibal Hamlin, Abraham Lincoln's vice-president.

Geography
Hamlin is located at  (39.916094, -95.627632).

Demographics

2010 census
As of the census of 2010, there were 46 people, 19 households, and 13 families residing in the city. The racial makeup of the city was 95.7% White, 2.2% African American, and 2.2% from other races. Hispanic or Latino of any race were 8.7% of the population.

There were 19 households, of which 26.3% had children under the age of 18 living with them, 57.9% were married couples living together, 5.3% had a female householder with no husband present, 5.3% had a male householder with no wife present, and 31.6% were non-families. 31.6% of all households were made up of individuals, and 5.3% had someone living alone who was 65 years of age or older. The average household size was 2.42 and the average family size was 3.00.

The median age in the city was 44 years. 23.9% of residents were under the age of 18; 2.1% were between the ages of 18 and 24; 28.3% were from 25 to 44; 26% were from 45 to 64; and 19.6% were 65 years of age or older. The gender makeup of the city was 56.5% male and 43.5% female.

2000 census
As of the census of 2000, there were 53 people, 19 households, and 15 families residing in the city. The racial makeup of the city was 100.00% White.

There were 19 households, out of which 42.1% had children under the age of 18 living with them, 52.6% were married couples living together, 31.6% had a female householder with no husband present, and 15.8% were non-families. 15.8% of all households were made up of individuals, and 5.3% had someone living alone who was 65 years of age or older. The average household size was 2.79 and the average family size was 3.06.

In the city, the population was spread out, with 32.1% under the age of 18, 32.1% from 25 to 44, 15.1% from 45 to 64, and 20.8% who were 65 years of age or older. The median age was 36 years. For every 100 females, there were 96.3 males. For every 100 females age 18 and over, there were 89.5 males.

The median income for a household in the city was $27,500, and the median income for a family was $34,375. Males had a median income of $18,750 versus $46,250 for females. The per capita income for the city was $14,813. None of the population and none of the families were below the poverty line.

Notable people
 Ellen Palmer Allerton (1835-1893), Walls of Corn poet, interred at Hamlin Cemetery

References

External links

 Hamlin - Directory of Public Officials
 USD 415, local school district
 Hamlin city map, KDOT

Cities in Brown County, Kansas
Cities in Kansas
1870 establishments in Kansas
Populated places established in 1870